Michael Makase (born 20 January 1990 in Keiskammahoek, South Africa) is a South African rugby union player who last played for the  in the Pro14 and the  in the Currie Cup and in the Rugby Challenge. He can play as a winger or a fullback.

Career

Youth / amateur rugby

Makase started his career playing amateur rugby for Winter Rose, where he played his rugby until 2013.

Border Bulldogs

He was one of several amateur club players brought into the  provincial set-up at the start of 2014 after the professional side was declared bankrupt. However, their single win in the competition meant that they finished bottom of the Southern Section log.

Makase started four of their six matches in the 2014 Currie Cup qualification tournament, where the Border Bulldogs endured another poor season, losing all six of their matches. He made two starts in the 2014 Currie Cup First Division, but suffered defeats in both matches as Border finished bottom of the log.

Southern Kings

At the start of 2016, Makase was one of six Border Bulldogs players that joined the ' Super Rugby squad for a trial period as they prepared for the 2016 Super Rugby season.

Statistics

References

South African rugby union players
Living people
1990 births
People from Keiskammahoek
Rugby union wings
Rugby union fullbacks
Border Bulldogs players
Southern Kings players
Eastern Province Elephants players
Rugby union players from the Eastern Cape